Alejandro Preinfalk (born 3 October 1970) is a Costa Rican alpine skier. He competed in two events at the 1992 Winter Olympics.

References

1970 births
Living people
Costa Rican male alpine skiers
Olympic alpine skiers of Costa Rica
Alpine skiers at the 1992 Winter Olympics
Place of birth missing (living people)